Disney Magic was released by Walt Disney Records on September 20, 2004. The album includes various pop stars like Christina Aguilera, Sting, Phil Collins, Celine Dion and Robbie Williams performing popular Disney songs. These tracks also appeared in Disney movie soundtracks. It is a two-disc album with 22 songs on each CD.

Reception 
Faridul Anwar Farinordin wrote that the songs "continue to stand the test of time with ... beautiful melodies and insightful lyrics." Gerald Martinez, in a positive review, said, "This is a set of commercial hits for all ages."

Track listing

Disc 1
 You'll Be in My Heart - Phil Collins - Tarzan
 Beyond the Sea - Robbie Williams - Finding Nemo
 No Way Out - Phil Collins - Brother Bear
 Beauty and the Beast - Peabo Bryson, Celine Dion - Beauty and the Beast
 Reflection - Christina Aguilera - Mulan
 My Funny Friend and Me - Sting - The Emperor's New Groove
 Colors of the Wind - Vanessa L. Williams - Pocahontas
 A Whole New World - Regina Belle, Peabo Bryson - Aladdin
 Strangers Like Me - Phil Collins - Tarzan
 Can You Feel the Love Tonight - Sally Dworsky, Kristle M. Edwards, Nathan Lane, Ernie Sabella, Joseph Williams - The Lion King
 Kiss the Girl - Peter Andre - The Little Mermaid
 The Bare Necessities - Phil Harris, Bruce Reitherman - The Jungle Book
 Everybody Wants to Be a Cat - Phil Harris - The Aristocats
 Look Through My Eyes - Phil Collins- Brother Bear
 Bibbidi-Bobbidi-Boo - Louis Armstrong - Cinderella
 He's a Tramp - Peggy Lee - Lady and the Tramp
 Little April Shower - Bambi
 When I See an Elephant Fly - Jim Carmichael, The Hall Johnson Choir - Dumbo
 The Time of Your Life - Randy Newman - A Bug's Life
 Someday - Eternal - The Hunchback of Notre Dame
 He Lives in You - Lebo M - The Lion King 2: Simba's Pride
 Can't Help Falling in Love - F4 - Lilo & Stitch

Disc 2
 On My Way - Phil Collins - Brother Bear
 Go the Distance - Michael Bolton - Hercules
 I Wan'na Be Like You (The Monkey Song) - Phil Harris, Louis Prima, Bruce Reitherman - The Jungle Book
 Circle of Life - Lebo M, Carmen Twillie - The Lion King
 True to Your Heart - 98°, Stevie Wonder - Mulan
 Under the Sea - Samuel E. Wright - The Little Mermaid
 Hakuna Matata - Nathan Lane, Ernie Sabella, Jason Weaver, Joseph Williams - The Lion King
 When You Wish Upon a Star - Louis Armstrong - Pinocchio
 You've Got a Friend in Me - Lyle Lovett, Randy Newman - Toy Story
 Your Heart Will Lead You Home - Kenny Loggins - The Tigger Movie
 The Ballad of Davy Crockett - Fess Parker - Davy Crockett, King of the Wild Frontier
 Heigh-Ho - Snow White and the Seven Dwarves
 I'll Try - Jonatha Brooke - Return to Never Land
 Shooting Star - Boyzone - Hercules
 Zip-a-Dee-Doo-Dah - James Baskett - Song of the South
 Who's Afraid of the Big Bad Wolf? - Billy Bletcher, Pinto Colvig, Dorothy Compton, Mary Moder - The Three Little Pigs
 Mickey Mouse March - Mickey Mouse Club
 The Siamese Cat Song - Peggy Lee - Lady and the Tramp
 A Spoonful of Sugar - Julie Andrews - Mary Poppins
 The Wonderful Thing About Tiggers - Jim Cummings - The Tigger Movie
 Love Will Find a Way - Heather Headley, Kenny Lattimore - The Lion King 2: Simba's Pride
 When She Loved Me - Sarah McLachlan - Toy Story 2

References

2004 compilation albums
Covers albums
Walt Disney Records compilation albums